Harry M. "Bud" Wyatt III (born 1949) is a retired lieutenant general of the United States Air Force (USAF) who last served as 14th Director, Air National Guard. He is also an attorney from Oklahoma and served as the Adjutant General of Oklahoma and the Oklahoma Secretary of Military Affairs. Wyatt maintained a private law practice until his election to the Oklahoma bench.

As director of the Air National Guard, Wyatt was responsible for formulating, developing and coordinating all policies, plans and programs affecting more than 106,800 Guard members in more than 88 flying wings and 200 geographically separated units throughout the United States, the District of Columbia, Puerto Rico, Guam and the Virgin Islands.

On January 30, 2013, Wyatt retired from USAF. At the retirement ceremony, Wyatt received Air Force Distinguished Service Medal for his service.

Military career
Wyatt entered the United States Air Force on June 24, 1971, following his graduation from Southern Methodist University with a Bachelor of Arts degree in business administration. He received his commission on November 24, 1971, as the 50,000th graduate from the Air Force Officer Training School. He graduated undergraduate pilot training from Laredo Air Force Base, Texas on January 26, 1973.

During August 1977, Wyatt left active duty and entered into the Oklahoma Air National Guard, of which he remains a commissioned officer. He earned his Juris Doctor degree from the University of Tulsa College of Law in 1980. During his tenure with the Guard, Wyatt has served as a fighter pilot, flight commander, group commander, vice wing commander, wing commander, and Chief of Staff of the Oklahoma National Guard. During 2003, Governor of Oklahoma Brad Henry appointed then-Brigadier General Wyatt to the position of Adjutant General of Oklahoma and nominated General Wyatt for appointment to the rank of major general.

On September 18, 2008, then-President of the United States George W. Bush nominated then-Major General Wyatt for assignment as Director, Air National Guard, and appointment to the rank of lieutenant general in the reserve active duty of the Air Force. Wyatt assumed the assignment on February 1, 2009, to succeeding General Craig McKinley who was reassigned as the chief of the National Guard Bureau.

Awards and decorations

Effective dates of promotion

Note: United States Air Force (USAF) and Air National Guard (ANG)

References

External links

 Official United States Air Force Bio

Living people
1949 births
Southern Methodist University alumni
University of Tulsa College of Law alumni
State cabinet secretaries of Oklahoma
United States Air Force generals
National Guard (United States) generals
Recipients of the Air Force Distinguished Service Medal
Recipients of the Legion of Merit
Heads of Oklahoma state agencies